Biagio Anthony "Ben" Gazzara (August 28, 1930 – February 3, 2012) was an American actor and director of film, stage, and television. He received numerous accolades, including a Primetime Emmy Award and a Drama Desk Award, in addition to nominations for three Golden Globe Awards and three Tony Awards.

Born to Italian immigrants in New York City, Gazzara studied at The New School and began his professional career with the Actors Studio, of which he was a lifelong member. His breakthrough role was in the Broadway play Cat on a Hot Tin Roof (1955–56), which earned him widespread acclaim. A memorable performance as a soldier on trial for murder in Otto Preminger's Anatomy of a Murder (1959) transitioned him to an equally successful screen career. As the star of the television series Run for Your Life (1965–1968), Gazzara was nominated for three Golden Globes and two Emmy Awards. He won his only Emmy Award for the television film Hysterical Blindness (2002).

He was a recurring collaborator of John Cassavetes, working with him on Husbands (1970), The Killing of a Chinese Bookie (1976) and Opening Night (1977). His other best-known films include The Bridge at Remagen (1969), Capone (1975) Voyage of the Damned (1976), Saint Jack (1979), Road House (1989), The Spanish Prisoner (1997), The Big Lebowski (1998), Buffalo '66 (1998), Happiness (1998), The Thomas Crown Affair (1999), Summer of Sam (1999), Dogville (2003) and Paris, je t'aime (2006). He also had a successful and prolific film career in Europe, particularly Italy, where he worked with preeminent directors like Giuseppe Tornatore, Giuliano Montaldo, Marco Ferreri, and Lars von Trier.

Gazzara was known for his gritty, naturalistic portrayals of intense, often amoral characters.  According to The Hollywood Reporter, "Gazzara positioned himself for 'creative elbow room,' seeking edgy characters in non-mainstream productions or infusing mainstream productions with idiosyncratic supporting turns."

Early life and education 
Gazzara was born in New York City, the son of Italian immigrants Angelina (née Cusumano) and Antonio Gazzara, a laborer and carpenter, each of Sicilian origin—Angelina from Castrofilippo and Antonio from Canicattì in the province of Agrigento. He was raised in a monolingual, Italian-speaking household, and did not learn English until he went to school. 

Gazzara grew up in New York's Kips Bay neighborhood; he lived on East 29th Street. He participated in the drama program at Madison Square Boys & Girls Club located across the street. He attended New York City's Stuyvesant High School, but finally graduated from Saint Simon Stock in the Bronx. Years later, he said that the discovery of his love for acting saved him from a life of crime during his teen years.

He went to City College of New York to study electrical engineering. After two years, he relented. He took classes in acting at the Dramatic Workshop of The New School in New York with the influential German director Erwin Piscator and afterward joined the Actors Studio.

Career

Early career 
Gazzara guest-starred on shows like Treasury Men in Action and Danger.

He received acclaim for his off-Broadway performance in End as a Man in 1953. The production was transferred to Broadway and ran until 1954.

In 1954, Gazzara (having modified his original surname from "Gazzarra") made several appearances on NBC's legal drama Justice, based on case studies from the Legal Aid Society of New York. He also guest-starred on shows such as Medallion Theatre and The United States Steel Hour.

Broadway success 

Gazzara became a Broadway sensation when he portrayed the role of Brick in Tennessee Williams's Cat on a Hot Tin Roof (1955–56) opposite Barbara Bel Geddes, directed by Elia Kazan. Gazzara turned down the role in the film version. The studio planned to offer the role to James Dean, but the part was given to Paul Newman after Dean's death.

He followed it with another long run in A Hatful of Rain (1956).

Film work 
He joined other Actors Studio members in the 1957 film The Strange One produced by Sam Spiegel.

He had a Broadway flop with The Night Circus (1958) and continued to guest-star on shows like Playhouse 90, Kraft Television Theatre, Armchair Theatre and DuPont Show of the Month.

His second film was a high-profile performance as a soldier on trial for avenging his wife's rape in Otto Preminger's courtroom drama Anatomy of a Murder (1959).

Gazzara told Charlie Rose in 1998 that he went from being mainly a stage actor who often would turn up his nose at film roles in the mid-1950s to, much later, a ubiquitous character actor who turned very little down. "When I became hot, so to speak, in the theater, I got a lot of offers," he said. "I won't tell you the pictures I turned down, because you'll say, 'You are a fool'—and I was a fool."

He went to Italy to make a comedy, The Passionate Thief (1960), with Anna Magnani and Totò.

Back in the US he did a TV movie, Cry Vengeance! (1961), and was second-billed in The Young Doctors (1961). He was also the mystery guest on "What's My Line" (6 September 1961).

He starred in Convicts 4 (1962).

He returned to Italy to make The Captive City (1962) with David Niven.

Gazzara was in the 1963 Actors Studio production of Strange Interlude on Broadway.

Television star 

Gazzara became well known in several television series, beginning with Arrest and Trial, which ran from 1963 to 1964 on ABC.

He also appeared in the TV special A Carol for Another Christmas (1964) and had a short Broadway run in A Traveller without Luggage in 1964. He also guest-starred on Kraft Suspense Theatre.

Gazzara was the male lead in A Rage to Live (1965) with Suzanne Pleshette.

He gained fame in the TV series Run for Your Life which ran from 1965 to 1968 on NBC, in which he played a terminally ill man trying to get the most out of the last two years of his life. For his work in the series, Gazzara received two Emmy nominations for "Outstanding Lead Actor in a Drama Series" and three Golden Globe nominations for "Best Performance by an Actor in a Television Series – Drama."

When the series ended Gazzara had a cameo in If It's Tuesday, This Must Be Belgium (1969) and a lead in the wartime action film The Bridge at Remagen (1969).

John Cassavetes 
Some of the actor's most formidable characters were those he created with his friend John Cassavetes in the 1970s. They collaborated for the first time on Cassavetes's film Husbands (1970), in which he appeared alongside Peter Falk and Cassavetes.

Gazzara starred in a television movie, Pursuit (1972), the directorial debut of Michael Crichton. He also made the television movies When Michael Calls (1972), Fireball Forward (1972), and The Family Rico (1972).

He made The Sicilian Connection (1972) in Italy, and did a science fiction film The Neptune Factor (1973). There were more television films You'll Never See Me Again (1973) and Maneater (1973).

He starred in the television miniseries QB VII (1974), which won six primetime Emmy Awards. The six-and-a-half-hour series was based on a book by Leon Uris and co-starred Anthony Hopkins. He then played gangster Al Capone in the biographical film Capone (1975). Cassevetes was in the support cast.

Gazzara appeared on Broadway in Hughie (1975) then worked again for Cassavetes as director in The Killing of a Chinese Bookie (1976), in which Gazzara took the leading role of the hapless strip-joint owner, Cosmo Vitelli. He starred in an action movie, High Velocity (1976), and was one of many stars in Voyage of the Damned (1976).

Gazzara returned to Broadway for a production of Who's Afraid of Virginia Woolf? with Colleen Dewhurst in 1976.

A year later, he starred in yet another Cassavetes-directed movie, Opening Night, as stage director Manny Victor, who struggles with the mentally unstable star of his show, played by Cassavetes's wife Gena Rowlands. He made an acclaimed TV movie The Death of Richie (1977).

Peter Bogdanovich 
Gazzara's career received a boost when Peter Bogdanovich cast him in the title role of Saint Jack (1979). His increased profile helped him be cast in the male lead of Bloodline (1979) and the Korean War epic Inchon (1980) co-starring Laurence Olivier and Richard Roundtree.

He made another for Bogdanovich, They All Laughed (1981).

1980s 
Gazzara made some films in Europe: Tales of Ordinary Madness (1981), The Girl from Trieste (1982), A Proper Scandal (1984), My Dearest Son (1985). He starred with Rowlands in the critically acclaimed AIDS-themed TV movie An Early Frost (1985), for which he received his third Emmy nomination.

He had a villainous role in the oft-televised Patrick Swayze film Road House, which the actor jokingly said is probably his most-watched performance.

Gazzara appeared in 38 films, many for television, in the 1990s. He worked with a number of renowned directors, such as the Coen brothers (The Big Lebowski), Spike Lee (Summer of Sam), David Mamet (The Spanish Prisoner), Walter Hugo Khouri (Forever), Vincent Gallo (Buffalo '66), Todd Solondz (Happiness), John Turturro (Illuminata), and John McTiernan (The Thomas Crown Affair).

He was on Broadway in Shimada (1992).

In his seventies, Gazzara continued to be active. In 2003, he appeared in Nobody Don't Like Yogi, an off-Broadway show about Yogi Berra which had a solid run and was in a revival of Awake and Sing! (2006).

He was in the ensemble cast of the experimental film Dogville, directed by Lars von Trier of Denmark and starring Nicole Kidman, as well as the television film Hysterical Blindness (he received an Emmy Award for his role).  In 2005, he played Agostino Casaroli in the television miniseries, Pope John Paul II. He completed filming his scenes in the film The Wait in early 2012, shortly before his death.

In addition to acting, Gazzara worked as an occasional television director; his credits include the Columbo episodes A Friend in Deed (1974) and Troubled Waters (1975). Gazzara was nominated three times for the Tony Award for Best Performance by a Leading Actor in a Play—in 1956 for A Hatful of Rain, in 1975 for the paired short plays Hughie and Duet, and in 1977 for a revival of Who's Afraid of Virginia Woolf?, opposite Colleen Dewhurst.

Personal life 
Gazzara was married three times, first to actress Louise Erickson (1951–1957). He married actress Janice Rule on November 25, 1961 in San Francisco. They had a daughter named Elizabeth. They divorced in 1979. He married model Elke Krivat in 1982 and remained married to her until his death. Gazzara adopted his wife's daughter Danja from her prior relationship. Following his separation from his first wife, Gazzara was engaged to stage actress Elaine Stritch and later disclosed a love affair with actress Audrey Hepburn. He and Hepburn co-starred in two of her final films, Bloodline (1979) and They All Laughed (1981).

In 1968, during filming of the war movie The Bridge at Remagen, co-starring Gazzara and friend Robert Vaughn, the Soviet Union and its allies invaded Czechoslovakia. The cast and crew were detained for a time; filming was later completed in West Germany. During their departure from Czechoslovakia, Gazzara and Vaughn assisted with the escape of a Czech waitress whom they had befriended. They smuggled her to Austria in a car waved through a border crossing that had not yet been taken over by the Soviet army in its crackdown on the Prague Spring.

Gazzara was the honorary starter of the 1979 Daytona 500, the first flag-to-flag Daytona 500 broadcast live on CBS. He was also featured in a 1994 article in Cigar Aficionado, in which he admitted smoking four packs of cigarettes a day until taking up cigar smoking in the mid-1960s.

Beginning in the late 1970s, Gazzara held permanent residence status in Italy. He maintained a second home in Umbria, where he lived while working in Europe.

Death 
Gazzara was diagnosed with throat cancer in 1999. He suffered a stroke in 2005. On February 3, 2012, he died of pancreatic cancer at Bellevue Hospital Center in New York. He was cremated.

Filmography

Film

Television

Bibliography

Awards and nominations

References

External links 

 
 
 

1930 births
2012 deaths
20th-century American male actors
21st-century American male actors
American male film actors
American male stage actors
American male television actors
American people of Italian descent
American television directors
Deaths from cancer in New York (state)
Deaths from pancreatic cancer
Drama Desk Award winners
Male actors from New York City
Outstanding Performance by a Supporting Actor in a Miniseries or Movie Primetime Emmy Award winners
People from the Lower East Side
Stuyvesant High School alumni
Theatre World Award winners